Vanguard Radio Network (VRN) is a Philippine radio network. Its corporate office is located at Rm. 614, Cityland Shaw Tower, St. Francis St. cor. Shaw Blvd., Ortigas Center, Mandaluyong, and its main headquarters is located at Pan-Philippine Highway, Brgy. Sangitan East, Cabanatuan. VRN operates a number of stations across regional places in Luzon under the Big Sound FM and Big Radio brands.

VRN stations

AM stations

FM stations

Former stations

Trademark dispute
In July 2011, VRN filed a legal trademark infringement case at the Intellectual Property Office against Manuelito F. Luzon, owner of ZimZam Management which operates and manages Metro Manila station DWKY (which used the "Big Radio" brand). Luzon was accused of using the said brand without any permission from VRN, citing that VRN already owned the said brand alongside the "Big Sound FM" brand. The case was upheld in 2017, and Luzon violated Section 147 of the Intellectual Property Code of the Philippines.

References

Radio stations in the Philippines
Philippine radio networks